Leonard L. (Len) Berry (born 1942) is a distinguished professor of marketing at Texas A&M University and a senior fellow at the Institute for Healthcare Improvement. Berry is a past president of the American Marketing Association. He has studied service delivery in healthcare at the Mayo Clinic and in cancer care settings. Berry is Texas A&M's most cited faculty member on Google Scholar, with over 200,000 citations.

Biography
Berry earned bachelor's and master's degrees at the University of Denver and a Ph.D. at Arizona State University. A longtime professor at Texas A&M University, Berry founded the school's Center for Retailing Studies in 1982 and directed it for 18 years. In 1983, Berry coined the term relationship marketing, which emphasizes the need for organizations to maintain (rather than simply acquire) customers. 

He is the University Distinguished Professor of Marketing and Regents Professor at Texas A&M University. He holds the M. B. Zale Chair in Retailing and Marketing Leadership in the Mays Business School at Texas A&M. He has studied healthcare service improvement in association with the Mayo Clinic and as a senior fellow at the Institute for Healthcare Improvement. Much of Berry's work has focused on service delivery in cancer care.

Berry and his wife established the Berry-AMA Book Prize for the Best Book in Marketing for the American Marketing Association (AMA). He is a past recipient of the AMA/Irwin/McGraw-Hill Distinguished Marketing Educator award. He is on the board of directors for the Nemours Foundation.

Berry has served on the board of directors of Genesco since 1999.

His son, Matthew Berry, is a former screenwriter and Senior Fantasy Sports Analyst for ESPN.

Notable publications
Berry L, Letchuman S, Ramani N, Barach P (2021). The High Stakes of Outsourcing in Health Care. Mayo Clinic Proceedings.
Berry L, Awdish R (2021). Health Care Organizations Should Be as Generous as Their Workers. Annals of Internal Medicine.
Berry L, Danaher T, Aksoy L, Keiningham T (2020). Service safety in the pandemic age. Journal of Service Research.
Berry L, Deming K, Danaher T (2018). Improving Nonclinical and Clinical-Support Services: Lessons From Oncology. Mayo Clinic Proceedings.
Berry L, Danaher T, Beckham D, Awdish R, Mate K (2017). When Patients and Their Families Feel Like Hostages to Health Care. Mayo Clinic Proceedings.
Berry L, Dalwadi S, Jacobson J (2017). Supporting the Supporters: What Family Caregivers Need to Care for a Loved One with Cancer. Journal of Oncology Practice.
Berry L, Bendapudi N (2007). Health Care: A Fertile Field for Service Research. Journal of Service Research.

References

External links

Living people
1942 births
Fellows of the American Marketing Association
Marketing people
American marketing people
Texas A&M University faculty
W. P. Carey School of Business alumni
University of Denver alumni
American corporate directors
Genesco people